Solomon Efimovich Shulman (20 January 1936 – 6 September 2017), also known as Sol Shulman and Semion Shulman, was an author, screenwriter, film director and adventurer.

Biography 
Shulman's first profession was engineering. In 1966 he completed his second higher education degree at the Academy of Cinema in Moscow (VGIK), training as a film director. From 1963 to 1973 he worked as one of the creators of a popular documentary series called Film-Adventurer's Almanac (USSR) (artistic director Vladimir A. Shnejderov).

He is the writer of more than forty documentary films, five feature film scripts, plus a host of literary and publicistic works, published in many countries worldwide. He has led film expeditions into the most distant corners of the planet—from the North Pole, to the summits of Pamir, the jungles of Africa, the islands of Oceania, and the deserts of Australia.

He has worked at film studios in the USSR, Yugoslavia, Germany, USA, Italy and Australia, and has been awarded the Order of Soviet Journalists of the USSR. He is a presidium member of the Eurasian Academy of Television and Radio, a member of the Russian Cinematographers Union and Russian Film Directors Guild, a member of the Russian Writers' Union, a member of the Australian Writers' Guild, and a professor at the Italian State University.

His public appearances always attract a large student crowd in the auditoriums of Italy, England, Germany, Australia and the USA. He lived his last years in Melbourne, Australia.

Prizes and awards 
1964 First Prize of the USSR Union of Journalists at the All-National Film-Festival for the documentary film In Broad Daylight (Izvestia, Moscow, 10 August 1964).
1971 Prize at the Int. Film-Festival in Czechoslovakia for the documentary films On the Slopes of Elbruce and In Ancient Khiv.
1976 First Prize at an Int. cinematography competition in Yugoslavia for the script The Disaster (Novosti, Belgrade, 20 January 1976).
1998 "Book of the month" awarded by a panel of professional critics for the book Power and Destiny (Izvestia, Moscow, 29 May 1998).
2006 Sign of Appreciation III degree, (Int. Conference of Journalists).

Work

Bibliography 
1974 On the Edge of the World ("AS" # 1, Yugoslavia)
1982 Russia Dies Laughing
1985 Aliens over Russia
1996 In the Land of Snow and Volcanoes ("New Russian Word", New York)
1998 Power and Destiny
1998 The Lucky Country' (GEO #7)
2002 Kings of the Kremlin2004 We are the Last to Leave...2004 Promenade along the Sotzialka2006 Tomorrow Never Comes (National Geographic, TRAVELER #6–7)
2007 The Nuclear Age Filmography (abridged) 
1963 The Black Sands of Kara-Kum1964 In Broad Daylight1965  Pamir – Roof of the World1966  The Valley of Sumbar1967  The Heart of Africa1968  The Earthquake1968  Where the Ships Winter1969  On the Slopes of Elbruce1969  In Ancient Khiva1970  The Edge of the World1971  In the Scythian Steppes1973  Alaid – Crater of Fire1974  The Land of my Enemies1984  Art-Nouveau1985  Underwater Children1990  Art Treasures of the World…2004  The Opal Hunter2006  White Man in a Hole Screenplays 
1968 The Nuclear Age (USSR, Mosfilm)
1975 The Disaster (Yugoslavia, "FRZ")
1978  The Silence (Australia, Victoria Film Corporation Co.)
1980 The Jewish Ticket (Australia, Australian Film Commission)
2007 Colonel Kondo'' (Kazakhstan, Capital Group Ltd. SA)

References

Sources

Газета «Оренбургский университет» – Сол Шульман: правда без жанров – № 43 (856) от 22.11.2006
СОЛОМОН ШУЛЬМАН – ИНОПЛАНЕТЯНЕ НАД РОССИЕЙ
Выбор Пушкина

 ]
Сол Шульман: Мы уходим последними...
ЖУРНАЛ "МИШПОХА"
«Экология и жизнь» №2, 2008
seva.ru – Севаоборот
Соломон ШУЛЬМАН в эфире радио «Культура»
Документальные фильмы. Первый канал

External links
ЖУРНАЛ "МИШПОХА"

1936 births
2017 deaths
People from Babruysk
Belarusian film directors
Belarusian Jews
Soviet film directors
Soviet Jews
Belarusian writers
Jewish writers
Soviet writers